Dashing Through the Snow is an upcoming American Christmas fantasy comedy film  directed by Tim Story, written by Scott Rosenberg, and starring Ludacris, Teyonah Parris and Lil Rel Howery.

Dashing Through the Snow is produced by Will Packer Productions and Smart Entertainment, and is scheduled to be released on Disney+, as a Disney+ original film in December 2023.

Cast
Ludacris
Lil Rel Howery
Teyonah Parris
Oscar Nunez
Gina Brillon
Mary Lynn Rajskub
Ravi Patel
Marcus Lewis
Madison Skye Validum
Sebastian Sozzi

Production
Filming began in Atlanta in August 2022.

References

External links
 

2023 films
2023 comedy films
2023 fantasy films
2020s American films
2020s Christmas comedy films
2020s English-language films
2020s fantasy comedy films
American Christmas comedy films
American fantasy comedy films
Disney+ original films
Films directed by Tim Story
Films produced by Will Packer
Films shot in Atlanta
Films with screenplays by Scott Rosenberg
Upcoming English-language films
Will Packer Productions films